Kim Min-hyuck (Hangul: 김민혁; born November 21, 1995 in Suncheon, South Jeolla) is a South Korean outfielder for the KT Wiz in the Korea Baseball Organization.

References 

KT Wiz players
KBO League outfielders
South Korean baseball players
1995 births
Living people
People from Suncheon
Sportspeople from South Jeolla Province